Kampin Laulu is a Finnish chamber choir founded in 1990.

Competitions
 International Anton Bruckner Choir Competition and Festival 2007 (Linz), winner of the chamber choir series
 Harald Andersén Chamber Choir Competition 2003 (Helsinki), III prize
 Cork International Choral Festival 1997, 1st place

Selected premieres
Juhani Komulainen: Keltainen nocturne (2000)
Jaakko Mäntyjärvi: No More Shakespeare Songs? (2000)
Jukka Linkola: Promootiokantaatti (2000)
Juhani Komulainen: Cat Morgan Introduces Himself (1999)

Discography
 Kivi sydämellä (2005)
 Verba sapientes sacra (2000)
 Kadonneet lahjat (1999)
 Something Rich and Strange (1998)
 guest choir on CMX records Rautakantele (1995), Discopolis (1996) and Dinosaurus Stereophonicus (2000)

References

External links
 Official website

Chamber choirs
Finnish choirs
Musical groups established in 1990